Web of Everywhere is a science fiction novel by British writer John Brunner, originally published in 1974 by Bantam Books in A Frederik Pohl Selection.

Like in The Infinitive of Go, this novel revolves around a teleportation technology. Matter Transmission is a John Brunner's science fiction theme which originally appears in The Dreaming Earth (1963).

References

External links
 Web of Everywhere at SF Reviews.net

1974 British novels
1974 science fiction novels
British science fiction novels
Novels by John Brunner
Bantam Books books